Matías Nocedal (born May 30, 1990) is an Argentine professional basketball player. He plays at the point guard and shooting guard positions. He is 1.94 m (6 ft 4 ½ in) in height and 91 kg (200 lbs.) in weight. He is currently with the pro club Basket Jesi in Legadue the second main Italian division. He was born in Ituzaingó, Buenos Aires.

References
 Motenko, Joshua (2005). "A Night With The Next Ginobili", on NBADraft.net. Accessed August 28, 2006.
 Mallo, Borja (2006). "Interview with Nocedal, Noticias de Álava, August 16.
 Brunetti, Diego (2006). "Argentino de Castelar despidió a Nocedal", on "www.basquetcapital.org.ar", Diciembre 2006.

External links
Draftexpress.com Profile

1990 births
Living people
Sportspeople from Buenos Aires Province
Argentine men's basketball players
Saski Baskonia players
Liga ACB players
Estudiantes Concordia basketball players
Guards (basketball)